The Waitepeka River is a river in New Zealand. A tributary of the Clutha River, it flows into that river near Port Molyneux.

See also
List of rivers of New Zealand

References

Rivers of Otago
Rivers of New Zealand